The 2005 Tennis Channel Open was a men's tennis tournament held in Scottsdale, Arizona in the United States that was part of the ATP International Series of the 2005 ATP Tour. It was the 18th edition of the tournament and was held from February 21 to February 28, 2005. Unseeded Wayne Arthurs won the singles title.

Finals

Singles

 Wayne Arthurs defeated  Mario Ančić 7–5, 6–3
 It was Arthur's only singles title of his career. He became the oldest first-time title winner since the ATP World Tour was formed in 1990.

Doubles

 Bob Bryan /  Mike Bryan defeated  Wayne Arthurs /  Paul Hanley 7–5, 6–4
 It was Bob Bryan's 1st title of the year and the 22nd of his career. It was Mike Bryan's 1st title of the year and the 24th of his career.

References

External links
 ITF tournament edition details

 
Tennis Channel Open
Tennis Channel Open
Tennis Channel Open
Tennis Channel Open
Tennis Channel Open